Fa is an international brand for personal care products. It is a subsidiary of German company Henkel AG. Fa products include skin care lotions, creams and gels, as well as shower gels, bubble baths, soaps and deodorants.

Name origin
From  "fabulous" and  "thread soap".

History
The first Fa product, a new bar soap, talc powders was launched in 1954 by Henkel-subsidiary Dreiring. In 1975, Henkel's first Fa-shower gel was introduced. Fa products were since then joined by new series of bar soaps, liquid soaps, shower gels, bubble baths, roll-on deodorants, stick deodorants and deosprays. As of today, Fa is marketed in some 120 countries.

In 2008, the Federal Cartel Office imposed a fine totaling EUR 21.6 million on the Henkel group for price fixing, among other things, for Fa brand shower gel.

The product family includes soap, shower gel and deodorant. Fa is one of the European market leaders. Products are also marketed under the Fa brand in the Middle East, Africa and Asia. In total, Fa is sold in 146 countries. Since Fa gets a new appearance every few years, the brand is considered a prime example for a product relaunch.

References

External links 
Official website

German brands
Henkel brands
Personal care brands
Products introduced in 1954